The Samsung Galaxy J1 Ace is a lower mid-range smartphone manufactured by Samsung Electronics as part of the Galaxy J series.

Specifications

Hardware 
The J1 Ace features a Marvell PXA1908 SoC including a dual-core 1.2 GHz ARM Cortex-A53 and 512 MB of RAM and 4 GB internal storage. It is available with either 4 or 8 GB of internal storage with support for removable microSD cards of up to 128 GB.

The cameras of the J1 Ace are a 5 megapixel main camera with LED flash and a 2 megapixel front-facing camera. Both can record 720p video at 30fps.

The dual-SIM model (SM-J110H/SM-J110L) features a The J1 Ace features a Spreadtrum SC7727S SoC with a quad-core 1.2 GHz ARM Cortex-A7 CPU and either 768 MB or 1 GB of RAM.

Software 
The J1 Ace (SM-J11x/j1acex) was originally shipped with Android 5.1.1 "Lollipop" with Samsung's TouchWiz user interface. An official release of TWRP exists for this device.

The J1 Ace DUOS (SM-J110H/SM-J110L) was originally shipped with Android 4.4.4 "KitKat" with Samsung's TouchWiz user interface. An official release of TWRP exists for this device.

Samsung Galaxy J1 Ace Neo 
At 11th July, 2016, Samsung released an updated version of the J1 Ace named J1 Ace Neo (J1 Ace VE in North Africa). It features a quad-core 1.5 GHz CPU with 1 GB of RAM. The rest of the specs remain the same, the model number is SM-J111F.

References 

Samsung Galaxy
Mobile phones introduced in 2015
Android (operating system) devices
Samsung mobile phones
Mobile phones with user-replaceable battery